Anže Grmek (born 12 October 2005) is a Slovenian motorcycle speedway rider.

Career
Grmek was selected for the Slovenian team for the 2021 Speedway of Nations and 2022 Speedway of Nations. In 2022, he reached the final of the 2022 Individual Speedway Junior European Championship.

Major results

World team Championships
2021 Speedway of Nations - =11th
2022 Speedway of Nations - =9th

See also 
 Slovenia national speedway team

References 

2005 births
Living people
Slovenian speedway riders